1142 Aetolia, provisional designation , is a stony background asteroid from the outer region of the asteroid belt, approximately 24 kilometers in diameter. It was discovered on 24 January 1930, by German astronomer Karl Reinmuth at the Heidelberg-Königstuhl State Observatory and named for the Greek region Aetolia.

Orbit and classification 

Aetolia has not been associated with any known asteroid family. It orbits the Sun in the outer main-belt at a distance of 2.9–3.4 AU once every 5 years and 8 months (2,076 days). Its orbit has an eccentricity of 0.08 and an inclination of 2° with respect to the ecliptic.

The body's observation arc begins at the USNO in May 1908, or 22 years prior to its official discovery observation.

Physical characteristics 

Aetolia has been characterized as a common stony S-type asteroid by Pan-STARRS photometric survey.

Rotation period 

In May 2010, two rotational lightcurves of Aetolia were independently obtained from photometric observations by French amateur astronomer René Roy and by Russell Durkee at the S.O.S. Observatory near Minneapolis, United States. Lightcurve analysis gave a rotation period of 10.730 and 10.74 hours with a brightness variation of 0.20 and 0.22 in magnitude, respectively. A more recent and lower-rated observation gave a divergent period of 7.68 hours.

Diameter and albedo 

According to the surveys carried out by the Japanese Akari satellite and the NEOWISE mission of NASA's Wide-field Infrared Survey Explorer, Aetolia measures between 22.135 and 24.92 kilometers in diameter  and its surface has an albedo between 0.216 and 0.273.

The Collaborative Asteroid Lightcurve Link assumes a standard albedo for stony asteroids of 0.20 and calculates a diameter of 27.10 kilometers based on an absolute magnitude of 10.2.

Naming 

This minor planet was named after the Greek region Aetolia, north of the Gulf of Patras. The official naming citation was mentioned in The Names of the Minor Planets by Paul Herget in 1955.

References

External links 
 Asteroid Lightcurve Database (LCDB), query form (info )
 Dictionary of Minor Planet Names, Google books
 Asteroids and comets rotation curves, CdR – Observatoire de Genève, Raoul Behrend
 Discovery Circumstances: Numbered Minor Planets (1)-(5000) – Minor Planet Center
 
 

001142
Discoveries by Karl Wilhelm Reinmuth
Named minor planets
19300124